Yunss Prince Michel Akinocho (born 11 March 1987) is a Moroccan-French basketball player.  He is also member of the Moroccan national basketball team.

Career
Born in Reims, France, Akinocho first played professional basketball as an 18-year-old in the French League.  In his most recent season, Akinocho averaged 8.8 points and 3.8 rebounds per game over eleven games of action for Proveo Merlins Crailsheim in Germany.  For the upcoming season, he has signed with Copenhagen sisu of the Danish League.

Akinocho played with the Morocco national basketball team at the FIBA Africa Championship 2009.  He played in all eight of Morocco's games, averaging 9.8 points and 3.2 rebounds per game.  Prior to this, Akinocho played for the France national basketball team in the 2003 European Championship for Cadets, helping the team to a fifth-place finish.

References

External links
Profile at proballers.com

Moroccan men's basketball players
French men's basketball players
French sportspeople of Moroccan descent
Sportspeople from Reims
1987 births
Living people
Cholet Basket players
Power forwards (basketball)
Small forwards
SISU BK players
CEP Lorient players